Léglise  may refer to:
 Léglise, a municipality of Belgium
 Jacques Léglise Trophy, an annual boys' team golf competition between Great Britain & Ireland and the Continent of Europe
 Max Léglise (1924–1996), a French oenologist